General Griffith may refer to:

Richard Griffith (general) (1814–1862), Confederate States Army brigadier general
Ronald H. Griffith (1936–2018), U.S. Army four-star general
Samuel B. Griffith (1906–1983), U.S. Marine Corps brigadier general

See also
Charles Griffiths (British Army officer) (1763–1829), British Army lieutenant general
Thomas Griffiths (general) (1865–1947), Australian Army brigadier general
Attorney General Griffith (disambiguation)